Siebel was a German aircraft manufacturer founded in 1937 in Halle an der Saale.

History 
It originated in the Klemm-Flugzeugwerke Halle that had been founded in 1934 as a branch of Leichtflugzeugbau Klemm in Böblingen. Its name changed to Siebel Flugzeugwerke when it was taken over by Friedrich Siebel in December 1937.

After World War II the company was revived as Siebel Flugzeugwerke ATG (SIAT) in West Germany in 1948, with its headquarters in Munich. In 1956, its headquarters were moved to Donauwörth and the company became WMD-Siebelwerke ATG (WMD/SIAT) in 1958 in cooperation with Waggon- und Maschinenbau GmbH Donauwörth (WMD). In 1968 the company was absorbed by Messerschmitt-Bölkow-Blohm after MBB became the major shareholder.

Products 
Siebel
 Siebel Fh 104 Hallore, medium transport
 Siebel Si 201, STOL reconnaissance aircraft (prototype)
 Siebel Si 202 "Hummel"  sportplane + trainer, 1938
 Siebel Si 204, transport + aircrew trainer
 DFS 346, research aircraft
 Siebel ferry, landing craft

SIAT
 SIAT 222
 SIAT 223 Flamingo

See also 
List of RLM aircraft designations

References

External links 

Defunct aircraft manufacturers of Germany